A low-power, wide-area network (LPWAN or LPWA network) is a type of wireless telecommunication wide area network designed to allow long-range communications at a low bit rate among things (connected objects), such as sensors operated on a battery.
The low power, low bit rate, and intended use distinguish this type of network from a wireless WAN that is designed to connect users or businesses, and carry more data, using more power. The LPWAN data rate ranges from 0.3 kbit/s to 50 kbit/s per
channel.

A LPWAN may be used to create a private wireless sensor network, but may also be a service or infrastructure offered by a third party, allowing the owners of sensors to deploy them in the field without investing in gateway technology.

Attributes 

 Long range: The operating range of LPWAN technology varies from a few kilometers in urban areas to over 10 km in rural settings. It can also enable effective data communication in previously infeasible indoor and underground locations.
 Low power: Optimized for power consumption, LPWAN transceivers can run on small, inexpensive batteries for up to 20 years. 
 Low cost: LPWAN's simplified, lightweight protocols reduce complexity in hardware design and lower device costs. Its long range combined with a star topology reduce expensive infrastructure requirements, and the use of license-free or licensed bands reduce network costs.

Platforms and technologies

Some competing standards and vendors for LPWAN space include:

 DASH7, a low latency, bi-directional firmware standard that operates over multiple LPWAN radio technologies including LoRa.
Wize is an open and royalty-free standard for LPWAN derived from the European Standard Wireless Mbus.

 Chirp spread spectrum (CSS) based

 Sigfox, UNB-based technology and French company.

 LoRa is a proprietary, chirp spread spectrum radio modulation technology for LPWAN used by LoRaWAN, Haystack Technologies, and Symphony Link.
 MIoTy, implementing Telegram Splitting technology.

 Weightless is an open standard, narrowband technology for LPWAN used by Ubiik
 ELTRES, a LPWA technology developed by Sony, with transmission ranges of over 100 km while moving at speeds of 100 km/h.
IEEE 802.11ah, also known as Wi-Fi HaLow, is a low-power, wide-area implementation of 802.11 wireless networking standard using sub-gig frequencies.

Ultra-narrow band
Ultra Narrowband (UNB), modulation technology used for LPWAN by various companies including:
 Sigfox, UNB-based technology and French company.
 Weightless, a set of communication standards from the Weightless SIG.
 NB-Fi Protocol, developed by WAVIoT company.

Others
 DASH7 Mode 2 development framework for low power wireless networks, by Haystack Technologies. Runs over many wireless radio standards like LoRa, LTE, 802.15.4g, and others.
 LTE Advanced for Machine Type Communications (LTE-M), an evolution of LTE communications for connected things by 3GPP.
 MySensors, DIY Home Automation framework supporting different radios including LoRa.
 NarrowBand IoT (NB-IoT), standardization effort by 3GPP for a LPWAN used in cellular networks.
 Random phase multiple access (RPMA) from Ingenu, formerly known as On-Ramp Wireless, is based on a variation of CDMA technology for cellular phones, but uses unlicensed 2.4GHz spectrum. RPMA is used in GE's AMI metering.
 Byron, a direct-sequence spread spectrum (DSSS) technology from Taggle Systems in Australia.
Wi-SUN, based on IEEE 802.15.4g.

See also
 Internet of things
 Wide area networks
 Static Context Header Compression (SCHC)
 QRP operation
 Slowfeld
 Through-the-earth mine communications
 Short range device
 IEEE 802.15.4 (Low-power personal-area network)
 IEEE 802.16 (WiMAX)

References

Wide area networks
Wireless networking